Energia Lviv  (ukr. Спортивний Клуб «Енергія» Львів), is a futsal club from Lviv, Ukraine.

Honors
Ukrainian Championship: 2
 2007, 2012

Ukrainian Cup: 1
 2011

UEFA Club Competitions Record

UEFA Futsal Cup

External links 
  Official web site

Futsal clubs in Ukraine
Sport in Lviv
Football clubs in Lviv